Lynx Edicions is a Spanish publishing company specializing in ornithology and natural history.

History
Since 2002, the company has been based in the Bellaterra district of Cerdanyola del Vallès.

Books
Lynx Edicions publishes the Handbook of the Birds of the World, a 16-volume series completed in 2012 that documents for the first time in a single work an entire animal class, illustrating and treating in detail all the species of that class. No such comprehensive work had been completed before for this or any other group in the animal kingdom.

Other books published by this company include the Handbook of the Mammals of the World (a multi-volume undertaking like the work on birds; work on it began in 2009); field guides to birds of various regions (starting in 2018); and Birds of South Asia. The Ripley Guide, published in collaboration with the Smithsonian Institution.

Internet Bird Collection
As a complement to the Handbook of the Birds of the World, and with the ultimate goal of disseminating knowledge about the world's avifauna, in 2002 Lynx Edicions started the Internet Bird Collection (IBC). This was a free-access, online audiovisual library of footage of the world's birds which hosted videos, photographs, and recordings illustrating various biological traits (e.g. subspecies, plumage, feeding, breeding, etc.) for 96% of all bird species. It was a non-profit endeavour fuelled by material from more than one hundred contributors around the world. In 2020 the IBC was incorporated into the Cornell Lab of Ornithology's Macaulay Library, which now hosts all of the content previously stored on the IBC.

References

External links
 Lynx Edicions website
 Internet Bird Collection at The Macaulay Library

Ornithological publishing companies
Book publishing companies of Spain
Cerdanyola del Vallès